Reginald Sidney Ellis (26 November 1917 – 21 June 2015) was an Australian pilot, flying instructor and cricketer. 

Ellis was a pilot in the Royal Australian Air Force during World War II, flying Lancaster bombers. He flew 11 sorties over occupied Europe. He ranked as a flight lieutenant and was part of No. 463 Squadron RAAF. He also served as a flying instructor in the UK during the war, and continued after the war as a flying instructor with the Royal Aero Club of South Australia.

Ellis played in the Victory Tests in England between ex-servicemen of Australia and England immediately after World War II, and then toured India and Australia with the Australian Services XI. He also played one first-class match for South Australia in 1945/46.

A left-arm orthodox spin bowler, Ellis was the most successful of the Services' bowlers in the matches in England, taking 23 wickets at an average of 19.13, with a best performance of 5 for 43 and 5 for 24 in the final match in Scarborough. Later, he took 5 for 25 and 3 for 32 when the Services XI beat Ceylon by an innings. His best figures were 6 for 144 for the Services XI against New South Wales in January 1946.

The last surviving member of the Services XI, Ellis was guest of honour at Sachin Tendulkar's Bradman Oration in Canberra in 2011. He died in June 2015, aged 97.

See also
 List of South Australian representative cricketers

References

External links
 
  - video interview by Mark Nicholas

1917 births
2015 deaths
People from Nuriootpa, South Australia
Australian cricketers
South Australia cricketers
Australian World War II pilots
Royal Australian Air Force officers
Australian Services cricketers
Royal Australian Air Force personnel of World War II
Dominions cricketers
Flight instructors
Military personnel from South Australia